Euzebiusz "Ebi" Smolarek (born 9 January 1981) is a Polish former professional footballer who is youth manager at Dutch club Feyenoord.

He played primarily as a striker or winger, representing clubs in the Netherlands, Germany, Spain, England, Greece, Poland, and Qatar.

Smolarek played 47 times for the Poland national football team, scoring 19 goals, the joint-tenth most in the nation's history. He was part of the Polish squads at the 2006 FIFA World Cup and UEFA Euro 2008.

Club career
Born in Łódź, Smolarek grew up in the Netherlands, where his father, Włodzimierz Smolarek, played in the Eredivisie and later worked as a coach. Smolarek went through the Feyenoord youth system and made it all the way to the first team.

On 24 August 2007, Smolarek signed with Racing de Santander for a reported €4.8 million.

On 29 August 2008, Racing loaned Smolarek to Bolton Wanderers for the season, with a view to signing him permanently. Smolarek's debut for his new club came as the team lost 3–1 to Arsenal on 20 September 2008.

On 3 January 2009, Smolarek scored his first, and only, goal for Bolton in the FA Cup 3rd Round match away to Sunderland but at the end of the season the club decided not to make his loan permanent. On 10 August 2009 he was released by Racing.

Despite some interest from Bundesliga clubs at the start of the 2009–10 season, Smolarek signed on 14 December 2009 with Kavala until 30 June 2012. On 25 July 2010, he and the club agreed to cancel his contract by mutual consent. He signed a two-year contract with Polonia Warsaw on 27 July 2010. On 29 July 2011, Smolarek agreed to cancel his contract with Polonia due to his financial expectations.

Smolarek also played for Ekstraklasa side Jagiellonia Białystok.

International career

A Polish international since 2002, Smolarek was selected for the 2006 FIFA World Cup but failed to score any goals.

He was Poland's (and group A's) top scorer in UEFA Euro 2008 qualifying scoring nine goals, beating Cristiano Ronaldo. Smolarek scored a hat-trick against Kazakhstan in Warsaw. He played all of the nation's matches in Switzerland and Austria, as Poland exited in the group stages.

In a memorable feat, he was the first Pole to score a goal against Portugal in 20 years, the previous one being his father. Impressively, he scored both goals in a 2–1 win in a Euro 2008-qualifying match.

On 1 April 2009, Smolarek scored four goals against San Marino. This made him top goal scorer for group three and tied him with Belgium's Wesley Sonck for second highest goal scorer for the European Zone of the 2010 FIFA World Cup Qualification.

Personal life
Smolarek is the son of another Polish international, Włodzimierz Smolarek. He was named after Portuguese footballer Eusébio. With his Dutch fiancée Thirza van Giessen he has a son (b. 27 April 2010), named Mees.

Career statistics

Club

International goals

Honours

Club
Feyenoord
 UEFA Cup: 2001–02

Individual
 Polish Footballer of the Year: 2005, 2006, 2007

References

External links

  
 
 

Living people
1981 births
Footballers from Łódź
Polish emigrants to the Netherlands
Association football forwards
Association football midfielders
Association football wingers
Polish footballers
Feyenoord players
Borussia Dortmund players
Racing de Santander players
Bolton Wanderers F.C. players
Kavala F.C. players
Polonia Warsaw players
Al-Khor SC players
ADO Den Haag players
Jagiellonia Białystok players
UEFA Cup winning players
Eredivisie players
Bundesliga players
La Liga players
Premier League players
Super League Greece players
Ekstraklasa players
Qatar Stars League players
Poland international footballers
2006 FIFA World Cup players
UEFA Euro 2008 players
Doping cases in association football
Polish sportspeople in doping cases
Polish expatriate footballers
Polish expatriate sportspeople in the Netherlands
Expatriate footballers in the Netherlands
Polish expatriate sportspeople in Germany
Expatriate footballers in Germany
Polish expatriate sportspeople in Spain
Expatriate footballers in Spain
Polish expatriate sportspeople in England
Expatriate footballers in England
Polish expatriate sportspeople in Greece
Expatriate footballers in Greece
Polish expatriate sportspeople in Qatar
Expatriate footballers in Qatar
Polish football managers
Polish expatriate football managers
Expatriate football managers in the Netherlands